The Copper Harbor Cemetery is a cemetery located on US 41 west of M-26 in Copper Harbor, Michigan. It was listed as a Michigan State Historic Site on January 8, 1981.

Burials occurred from 1853 through 1926. Twelve graves are marked with dates prior to 1900.

See also
 List of Michigan State Historic Sites in Keweenaw County, Michigan

References

External links
 
 

Cemeteries in Michigan
Michigan State Historic Sites in Keweenaw County
1853 establishments in Michigan